Khur and Biabanak County (Shahrestān Khur va Biābānak) is in Isfahan province, Iran. The capital of the county is the city of Khur. At the 2006 census, the region's population (as Khur and Biabanak District of Nain County) was 17,488 in 4,924 households. The following census in 2011 counted 17,793 people in 5,412 households, by which time the district had been separated from the county to become Khur and Biabanak County. At the 2016 census, the county's population was 19,761 in 6,420 households. Khur and Biabanak County has the smallest population of Iran's mainland counties. (Abumusa County, consisting of islands in the Persian Gulf, has a smaller population).

Administrative divisions

The population history and structural changes of Khur and Biabanak County's administrative divisions over three consecutive censuses are shown in the following table. The latest census shows one district, three rural districts, and three cities.

References

 

Counties of Isfahan Province